The Illinois Men's Volleyball Club is a registered student organization at the University of Illinois that plays men's volleyball.  This team is composed of students from the University of Illinois and is designated as a club team because the University does not have a varsity men's volleyball team.  The club is based at the University of Illinois at Urbana Champaign and is a member of the Midwest Intercollegiate Volleyball Association.  The club is divided into three teams divided according to level of competitiveness.  All teams in the club compete only in tournaments and there are no lone matches unless they are specially scheduled. The Illinois Men's Volleyball Club was established in 1984 and quickly became one of the top collegiate men's club volleyball teams in the nation.  The team has been ranked among the top ten club teams in the nation since 1997. The club placed third in the nation in 2003, 2005, and 2007 and second in 2004.  Additionally, the Illinois Men's Volleyball Club hosts an annual tournament in Champaign, Illinois called the Illini 16 and co-hosts the Hoosier-Illini Classic with Indiana University.  Additionally, the club hosted an exhibition match for the Blue and Orange teams for the first time in 2008.  The Blue team played Purdue University while the Orange team played Illinois State University.

Organization
The Illinois Men's Volleyball Club consists of three teams of varying competitiveness and time commitment.  The first team is the Blue Team and is considered to be the best team.  This team competes in Division One of the Midwest Intercollegiate Volleyball Association and generally participates in about twelve tournaments a year including the national tournament.  The Orange Team is considered the second team and competes in Division Two of the Midwest Intercollegiate Volleyball Association.  This team participates in about eight tournaments a year.  Both the Blue and Orange teams travel to the national championships hosted by the National Intramural-Recreational Sports Association.  This tournament hosts only club teams from within the United States and no NCAA varsity men's volleyball teams.  The White team is the third team and competes in about seven tournaments every year.  This team competes in the Midwest Collegiate Volleyball Association. The White team is traveling to the National Tournament for the first time ever in 2017.  The Blue and Orange teams generally practice three times a week while the White team practices twice a week.  The tryouts for all teams are in September and generally last two or three days. The season for all three teams lasts throughout the school year with nationals being held in April.  On average, eighty students try out for the club and tryouts are open to any University of Illinois male student.  Each team consists of about fifteen players.  Students may also attempt to join the team at other times throughout the year by attending several practices that are viewed as their tryout.  The Illinois Men's Volleyball Club is organized and operated by player-elected officers that are chosen at the end of each season.  The current officer positions are President, Vice President, Secretary, and Treasurer.  The club does not have a coach and each team is instead led by a player who is chosen to be the captain.  The club is supported by dues paid by every club member and through funding provided by the University' student organization fund.  Additionally, fundraising events are held including a T-shirt sale.  The club also receives funds from the University of Illinois because it is registered as a student organization.  The designation as a registered student organization allows the club to receive funds from the university, use university buildings for practice, and be officially associated with the university.

Past standings and results
The Illinois Men's Volleyball Club has placed in the top ten nationally since 1999.  They have also won the Big Ten Conference ten times and have five Midwestern Intercollegiate  Volleyball Association championships.  The Big Ten Conference in the Midwestern Intercollegiate Volleyball Association consists of the University of Illinois, the University of Michigan, the University of Iowa, Michigan State University, Purdue University, Indiana University, the University of Minnesota, Ohio State University, Northwestern University, and the University of Wisconsin-Madison.  This conference is not associated with the Big Ten Conference present in NCAA athletics The club competes in a Big Ten Conference championship tournament as well as the Midwestern Intercollegiate Volleyball Association tournament and the national tournament at the end of the season.  The Illinois Men's Volleyball Club Blue team also had two players named to the First Team All-Tournament team in 2007 and has had at least one player on the First Team All-Tournament team since 2003. The table below displays the results of the National-Intramural Recreational Sports Association/National Club Volleyball Federation tournament and the Midwestern Intercollegiate Volleyball Association tournament.

Fighting Illini Hall of Fame
Ryan Fabrizius-Middle Blocker:2003-2007*All Time Leader in Blocks (476)
Jim Mazurski-Libero:2003-2007*All time leader in digs (2,745). 2x All-American
Doug Burchett-Setter:2006-2010*All Time Leader in Assists (5,346)
Kevin Deeke-Opposite Hitter:2006-2010*All Time Leader in Kills and Aces (1,390) (210)
Miles Kilgalon-Middle Blocker:2006-2009*3 Time 1st Team All-American
Emmett Culligan-Outside Hitter:2007-2010*All Time Leader in Sweatpants (1000)
Mike Walsh-Middle Blocker:2009-2011*All Time Leader in Kill Percentage (.697)
Brendan Ori-Libero:2007-2010*All Time Leader in Digs (883)
Joshua Scaletta-Setter:2008-2011*Captain of the 2009 D3 National Champions
Karl Miller-Outside: 2007-2011*All Time Wins in the Blame Game
Kyle Breitbarth-Libero: 2010-2016*All Time Leader in Leaving Vegas Up Money ($600)
Mike Konrad-Coach:2007-2010*Coach of the 2009 D3 National Champions
Troy Krafthefer-Middle Blocker: 2012-2016 All-American, National Champion. All-time leader red cards (39)
Steve Drent-Outside: 2010-2014*Best friend of Jim Kelleher
Tom Wesolowski:2013-2013*All-time leader in face injuries (6)
Alexander Nathan Kahn 2012-2016: All-time leader in Middle Names

References 

Voll
Volleyball clubs established in 1984
1984 establishments in Illinois